Austria competed at the 2004 Summer Paralympics in Athens, Greece. The team included forty-four athletes—forty men and four women. Austrian competitors won twenty-two medals, eight gold, ten silver and four bronze, to finish twentieth in the medal table.

Medallists

Sports

Athletics

Men's track

Men's field

Women's field

Boccia

Mixed individual

Mixed pairs/teams

Cycling

Men's road

Men's track

Equestrian

Shooting

Men

Swimming

Men

Women

Table tennis

Men

Teams

Wheelchair tennis

Men

See also
Austria at the Paralympics
Austria at the 2004 Summer Olympics

References 

Nations at the 2004 Summer Paralympics
2004
Summer Paralympics